CPRI may refer to:
 Center for Pharmaceutical Research and Innovation, an academic research center 
 Central Power Research Institute, a power research facility in India 
 Child and Parent Resource Institute, a medical facility
 Common Public Radio Interface, a communications standard